Power-to-Heat (also PtH or P2H) is a rather new name for the conversion of electrical energy into heat. This can be done through conventional heating resistors, electrode boilers and heat pumps.

The purpose of PtH systems is to utilize excess electricity generated by renewable energy sources which would otherwise be wasted. Hence RES-E can displace fossil energy and reduce emissions in the heating sector.  In contrast to simple electric heating systems such as night storage heating which covers the complete heating requirements, Power-to-Heat systems are hybrid systems, which additionally have traditional heating systems using chemical fuels like wood or natural gas. When there are excess energy the heat production can result from electric energy otherwise the traditional heating system will be used. In order to increase flexibility power-to-heat systems are often coupled with heat accumulators. The power supply occurs for the most part in the local and district heating networks. Power-to-heat systems are also able to supply buildings or industrial systems with heat.

See also 

 Electric heating
 Power-to-X

References 

Energy engineering
Renewable energy